Things Unseen is a studio album by the American jazz pianist Kenny Barron, released in 1997 via Verve Records. The album contains eight original and previous compositions written by Barron.

Reception
In his review on JazzTimes, Willard Jenkins noted: "Barron, who has achieved something akin to MVP status among piano players primarily for his broad capacity to enhance whoever’s session or record date he lays hands on, should also be recognized for his ability to artfully craft recordings under his imprimatur. The elegant 'Things Unseen' continues that craft. There is a certain airiness, a certain judicious use of space that pervades this date, as Barron and company certainly know how to avoid sonic traffic jams and engage a sense of openness that enhances this disc".

Track listing

Personnel
Band
Kenny Barron – piano 
David Williams – bass
Victor Lewis – drums
John Scofield – guitar
Mino Cinelu – percussion 
John Stubblefield – saxophone 
Eddie Henderson – trumpet 
Naoko Terai – violin

Production
Jean-Philippe Allard – executive producer 
Josef Woodard – liner notes 
Joe Marciano – mastering, mixing
Joanne Klein – producer

References

External links

Kenny Barron albums
1997 albums
Verve Records live albums